Frederick Joseph Tilyard (5 July 1896 – 8 February 1954) was a New Zealand rugby union player. A first five-eighth, Tilyard represented  in 18 games at a provincial level between 1918 and 1925. He played just one match for the New Zealand national side, the All Blacks, against the touring New South Wales team at Carisbrook in 1923, in which he scored a try. He did not play in any Test matches.

References

1896 births
1954 deaths
Australian emigrants to New Zealand
New Zealand rugby union players
New Zealand international rugby union players
Wellington rugby union players
Rugby union fly-halves
Rugby union players from Tasmania